Lola Igna is a 2019 Filipino comedy film directed and written by Eduardo Roy Jr., and starring veteran actress Angie Ferro, and Yves Flores. It had a theatrical release in the Philippines on September 12, 2019, as one of the entries of the 2019 Pista ng Pelikulang Pilipino.

Plot
Lola Igna, a centenarian farmer living alone in a hut on her ricefield, becomes the subject of media attention in her sleepy provincial town when the Mayor announces that she has a shot at becoming the world's oldest living grandmother. Asked what she wants in life, she shocks everyone when she says she wants to die.

Igna's granddaughter Nida takes advantage of her grandmother's new-found fame by selling themed merchandise of her while Igna tries to maintain her routine and fend off droves of journalists and tourists at her home. One day, she empties her urinal at a boy who turns out to be Tim, her great-grandson from her estranged other granddaughter Ana, who left years ago after an argument with Nida. Tim explains that he left her mother to escape domestic troubles and seeks to reconnect with Lola Igna while making a vlog. Tim quickly learns the ropes at farm work and helps Igna gather wood, which Igna tells will be used for building her coffin. Igna explains that she started preparing for her death after seeing her late husband Carias one night, thinking that he is coming to take her into the afterlife. Tim is perplexed but continues to gather the wood.

After attending a wake, Lola Igna breaks down in front of Tim, saying that the reason she wants to die is that she has been fed up attending the funerals of everyone she has known, particularly as she has outlived many of those she had helped be born as a midwife. Tim finally understands his great-grandmother's predicament and proceeds wholeheartedly into building her coffin, despite Nida's protestations. He also helps Lola Igna how to use his technical equipment as she opens up to visitors and well-wishers. Some time later, a pregnant Ana arrives to be with her son and grandmother and reconciles with Nida. Ana then goes into labor and successfully gives birth by the ricefield, only to die upon seeing Carias. Lola Igna uses her coffin for Ana's funeral instead.

Media attention on Lola Igna fades away as another person receives the oldest living grandmother title, and life in town returns to normal. Tim stays on with Lola Igna at her farm while raising her sister.

Cast

Main cast
 Angie Ferro as Lola Igna
 Yves Flores as Tim

Supporting cast
 Maria Isabel Lopez as Nida
 Meryll Soriano as Ana
 Soliman Cruz as Town Mayor
 Royce Cabrera as Bok
 Jojo Riguerra as Nida's Husband
 Peewee O'Hara as Senyang (Nida's Storekeeper)
 Armand Reyes as Gusting
 Joel Saracho as Quack Doctor
 Rener Concepcion as Carias (Igna's Husband)
 Chamyto Aguedan as Tourist
 Sarah Pagkalinawan-Brakensiek as Tourist

Production
Lola Igna was directed by Eduardo Roy Jr. under the production of Found Films and EMBA Productions.

According to Roy, the concept of the film originated from his own reflections on his relationship with his maternal great-grandmother who is a resident of Sagada who died at the age of 80 years in 2012. The film was a tribute to Roy's great grandmother, describing it as story of what if he got to bond more with his great grandmother since he did not have a chance to learn more about her since she lived in the remote Mountain Province. Lola Igna is a representation of Roy's great grandmother and the main protagonist who went to Sagada to meet Igna represents himself.

The film was to feature in Cinemalaya twice; the first in 2012 and the second in 2017. The film had to be pulled-out as one of the official entries of the 2012 edition due to revisions on the script that would satisfy the demands of an international distributor and due to budgetary concerns. Work on the film had to be halted due to director Eduardo Roy's illness consequentially caused its withdrawal from the 2017 edition of Cinemalaya.

Release
This film was supposed to be part of Cinemalaya 2012 but it was withdrawn because the film's script was revised by its producer in order to meet the needs of an international distributor. It was chosen again and was supposed to feature as one of the entries of the Cinemalaya 2017 but production backed out from the film fest. In 2018, Lola Igna was chosen as one of the official entries of the 2018 ToFarm Film Festival Philippines. However, it got pulled out again. It was announced as an official entry to the 3rd Pista ng Pelikulang Pilipino of the Film Development Council of the Philippines and was shown in Philippine cinemas from September 12–19, 2019.

Reception

Critical reception
The film has received critical acclaim in the 2019 Pista ng Pelikulang Pilipino's Awards Night on September 16, 2019. It was awarded the coveted "Best Picture", Best Screenplay, Best Musical Score and Best Actress for Angie Ferro.

A review excerpt published by GMA News and written by J. Neil Garcia stated: "What an ordinary, straightforward, and given the recent spate of miserablist and ‘poverty-porny’ films entirely refreshing vision of our people’s inner truth—indeed, of all of humanity’s inner and most resplendent truth: while everyone and everything passes, what will remain of us is love. Kudos, hence, to Lola Igna’s producers, writers, cast, and crew, for such a touching and memorable film. Congratulations to Roy, who is moving from strength to strength as a director, and who is definitely one of our cinema’s bright new lights. And of course, hats off and immense respect to the great Angie Ferro, whose dignified and poignantly human ‘enfleshment’ of Lola Igna will doubtless be a touchstone performance for other actors for many generations to come."

Meanwhile, Oggs Cruz of Rappler.com commented that, "Eduardo Roy, Jr.’s Lola Igna is an absolute charmer. Society still plays a crucial part in this otherwise private concern, and Roy doesn’t just understand that, he fully comprehends that everything is interconnected. The film instinctively balances the inhumanity of being a world record and the profoundness of the pleasures of death after living a life fully lived, resulting in a truly tender portrait of this world’s most subtle and mysterious injustices."

Miggy Ramos of Cinema Bravo writes a review entitled, "Beautiful, heartfelt lessons in life (and death)", praising the film favorably and stating that, "Lola Igna gives us a chance to revisit our purpose in life: the very reason for our existence. It tells us that life is precious and that we have to be thankful for it every day. We may not know what the future would bring but living in the present is much more important. Lola Igna, as a character and a film, could help us move on from our struggles in life by simply living more and loving the people around us to the fullest."

Accolades

References

2019 films
2019 comedy-drama films
Philippine comedy-drama films
Cinemalaya films
Films directed by Eduardo Roy Jr.